Nisar Ahmed Cheema is a Pakistani politician who has been a member of the National Assembly of Pakistan since August 2018.

Early and personal life 
He was born in Wazirabad.

He served as Director General Health Services Punjab

He is the brother of Iftikhar Cheema and Zulfiqar Ahmad Cheema.

Political career
He was elected to the National Assembly of Pakistan as a candidate of Pakistan Muslim League (N) (PML-N) from Constituency NA-79 (Gujranwala-I) in 2018 Pakistani general election. He received 142,545 votes and defeated Muhammad Ahmed Chattha, a candidate of Pakistan Tehreek-e-Insaf.

References

Living people
Pakistani MNAs 2018–2023
Year of birth missing (living people)
Pakistan Muslim League (N) MNAs